Coors Brewing Company, or Coors, is now part of the Molson Coors Beverage Company.
Coors may also refer to:

Companies
Adolph Coors Company, a former holding company controlled by the heirs of founder Adolph Coors
Coors Brewers, the UK arm of the Coors Brewing Company
CoorsTek, and its precursors Coors Porcelain and Coors Ceramics, a privately owned manufacturer of industrial products
MillerCoors, a joint venture between SABMiller and Molson Coors Brewing Company

People
Adolph Coors (formerly "Kuhrs", 1847–1929), founded Coors Brewing Company in 1873
Adolph Coors II (1884–1970), son of Adolph Coors, second chairman of the Coors Brewing Company
Adolph Coors III (1916–1960), grandson of Adolph Coors, was kidnapped and murdered
Coors Light Twins, models and actresses
Herman Frederik Coors, son of Adolph Coors, founded the H.F. Coors China Company in 1925 and owned the Herman Coors House
Joseph Coors (1917–2003), grandson of Adolph Coors
Pete Coors (born 1946), great-grandson of Adolph Coors, chairman of the Molson Coors Brewing Company
William Coors (1916–2018), grandson of Adolph Coors, former president and chairman of the Coors Brewing Company
Holly Coors (1920–2009), American conservative political activist and philanthropist
D. Stanley Coors (1889–1960), bishop of the Methodist Church

Places
Coors Amphitheatre (Greenwood Village, Colorado), former name of amphitheatre in Denver
Coors Events Center, arena in Boulder
Coors Field, baseball field in Denver
Coors Visitor Centre, former name of museum in Burton upon Trent, UK

Sports
Coors 200 (disambiguation), Coors Light 300, car races
Coors 420, NASCAR stock car race held in Nashville
Coors International Bicycle Classic, bicycle race
Coors Light Cash Spiel, curling tournament held in Duluth

Other uses
Coors Boulevard, a highway in New Mexico
Coors Cutter, beer brand
Coors Light, beer brand
Coors Light Pole Award, NASCAR racing award

See also
Lattie F. Coor (born 1936), former President of Arizona State University and the University of Vermont
The Corrs, Irish musical band
Coors Amphitheatre (disambiguation)
Coor (disambiguation)
 Cohrs